This article provides details of international football games played by the North Korea national football team from 1956 to 1979.

International matches

1956

1959

1960

1963

1964

1965

1966

1969

1970

1971

1972

1973

1974

1975

1976

1978

1979
 
 
 
 
 
 

Notes

References

Football in North Korea
1956
1970s in North Korean sport
1950s in North Korea
1960s in North Korea